Muriel Gunsing is a former Dutch cricketer. She made her international debut against Denmark cricket team in 1997. She has played for Dutch cricket team in 2 Women's ODIs.

References

External links 
 

Date of birth missing (living people)
Living people
Dutch women cricketers
Netherlands women One Day International cricketers
Year of birth missing (living people)